The 2013 Czech Republic motorcycle Grand Prix was the eleventh round of the 2013 MotoGP season. It was held at the Masaryk Circuit in Brno on 25 August 2013.

Classification

MotoGP

Moto2

Moto3

Championship standings after the race (MotoGP)
Below are the standings for the top five riders and constructors after round eleven has concluded.

Riders' Championship standings

Constructors' Championship standings

 Note: Only the top five positions are included for both sets of standings.

References

Czech Republic motorcycle Grand Prix
Czech Republic
Motorcycle Grand Prix
Czech Republic motorcycle Grand Prix